Trowutta is a rural locality in the local government area of Circular Head in the North West region of Tasmania.
The 2016 census determined a population of 92 for the state suburb of Trowutta.

History
The locality was gazetted in 1962.

Geography
The Arthur River forms the southern boundary and most of the eastern. The Duck River forms the northern boundary. Trowutta Arch, a tourist attraction, is in the centre of the locality.

Road infrastructure
The C218 route (Trowutta Road / Reids Road / Tayatea Road) enters from the north-west and runs south and east before exiting. Route C223 (Maguires Road) starts at an intersection with route C218 and runs north-east before exiting.

References

Localities of Circular Head Council
Towns in Tasmania